The Army of Africa was an unofficial but commonly used term for those portions of the French Army stationed in French North Africa (Morocco, Algeria and Tunisia) from 1830 until the end of the Algerian War in 1962, including the French units made up of indigenous recruits.

Composition
The Army of Africa included indigenous Arab or Berber volunteers; (spahis, Goumiers and tirailleurs); regiments largely made up of pied-noir French settlers doing their military service (zouaves and chasseurs d'Afrique); and non-French volunteers (Légion étrangère). The divisions were not absolute and (for example) volunteers or conscripts from mainland France might choose to serve with the Muslim rank and file of the spahis and tirailleurs, while Arab volunteers might appear amongst the ranks of the zouaves. Prior to World War I, one battalion of each of the four zouave regiments then in existence, was recruited in France. These battalions' bases were thereby providing a framework that could be expanded in the event of general mobilisation, and which were physically located closer to the geographical threat of Germany.

In May 1913 a limited form of selective conscription was applied to the Muslim population of Algeria. Only 2,000 conscripts a year were obtained by this method out of approximately 45,000 possible candidates and Muslim enlistment remained predominately voluntary in peacetime. Even during World War I the majority (89,000 out of 170,000) of Muslim soldiers who served were volunteers. As in France itself, military service was an obligation of citizenship and all physically fit male settlers of French origin were required to undertake two years of compulsory service (three years from 1913).

Officers of all branches of the Army of Africa were predominantly French Europeans, though a certain number of commissioned positions up to and including the rank of captain were reserved for Muslim personnel in the spahis and tirailleurs. In 1932 the proportion of officiers indigenes was fixed at nine out of a total of 67 in each of these regiments.

In 1956, in the course of the Algerian War, a new policy of greater racial integration was adopted in the remaining units of the old Army of Africa. Algerian tirailleur regiments were to be made up of roughly 50% "Frenchmen of North African stock" (i.e. Arab and Berber Muslims) and an equivalent number of French volunteers and conscripts, largely drawn from the European settler community. At the same time, additional Muslim soldiers were to be incorporated into previously mostly European units such as the zouaves, until they made up to 25% of the total. Growing tensions within mixed units as the war continued, plus the threat of rebel FLN reprisals against Muslim volunteers, largely nullified this attempted reform.

Formal status
The Armée d’Afrique was formally part of the French metropolitan army comprising a separate army corps. It is noted that in 1873 the term Armée d'Afrique was used with reference to the troops of the 19th Army Corps (19e Corps d'Armée). It was one of 21 army corps of the Metropolitan Army formed in 1870. It was the only corps whose military district did not cover mainland France. As such it was separate from the French Colonial Forces which came under the Ministry of Marine and comprised both French and indigenous units serving in Sub-Saharan Africa and elsewhere in the French colonial empire.

African Light Infantry

The battalions of Infanterie Légère d'Afrique (African Light Infantry) were penal units made up of convicted military criminals from all branches of the French Army, who had finished their sentences in military prisons but still had time to serve before their terms of engagement were completed. The preference was not to return them to their original units where they might undermine discipline or brutalise their fellow soldiers.

The first two battalions of the Infanterie Legere d'Afrique were raised in 1832 for service in Algeria. Ironically known as les Joyeux (the "merry ones") these units were generally used for road and other construction work under harsh discipline. They were however used for combat service when circumstances demanded in Africa, Indochina and in France itself during World War I. Three battalions sent to France at the outbreak of World War II to work on fortifications, were rearmed in April 1940 and saw active service prior to the Fall of France.

Officers of the African Light Infantry were seconded from other regiments as were some non-commissioned officers. Many NCOs were however former "Joyeux" who chose to remain with these unusual units and exercise authority, after they had completed their original terms of service.

Desert troops
Camel mounted Meharistes plus Compagnies Sahariennes (desert infantry and later mechanised troops) were maintained in the Sahara. The Foreign Legion provided mule mounted detachments for service in southern Algeria and, from 1940 to 1962, four of the Compagnies Sahariennes.

In addition to the above, units or individuals from the mainland French Army were sometimes posted to service in North Africa, as were detachments of the Gendarmerie and the Tirailleurs Senegalais.

World War I

At the outbreak of war in August 1914, the Army of Africa in Algeria and Tunisia comprised nine regiments of Algerian Tirailleurs, four of zouaves, six of chasseurs d'Afrique, four of spahis and two of the Foreign Legion. In Morocco nineteen battalions of tirailleurs and nine of zouaves were on active service, along with elements of the Foreign Legion and the African Light Infantry. Large numbers of these troops were sent immediately to serve in France, mainly drawn from the peacetime garrisons of Algeria and Tunisia.

In 1914 33,000 Muslim Algerians were already serving with the spahis, tirailleurs and other units of the Army of Africa. In the course of the war a further 137,000 enlisted either as volunteers (57,000) or as wartime conscripts (80,000). Of the total of 170,000, 36,000 were killed.

On 22 April 1915 the first German use of chlorine gas on the Western Front was directed against the French 45th Division, consisting of zouaves, Algerian tirailleurs and African Light Infantry.

World War II

As had been the case in 1914, substantial numbers of the Army of Africa were moved to mainland France on the outbreak of World War II. In May 1940 14 regiments of zouaves, 42 regiments of Algerian, Tunisian and Moroccan tirailleurs, 12 regiments and demi-brigades of the Foreign Legion and 13 battalions of African Light Infantry were serving on all fronts.

Following the fall of France, the Army of Africa was reduced to a level of 120,000 under Axis direction. General Maxime Weygand was however able to maintain and train a further 60,000 men in French North Africa disguised as auxiliary police, "provisional conscripts" and "unarmed workers".

From the end of 1942, the Army of Africa was headed by French general Henri Giraud and fought in the Tunisia Campaign before its merger with General Charles de Gaulle's Free French Forces. North African units subsequently played a major role in the liberation of Corsica (September - October 1943) and the Italian Campaign (1943–44) in the French Expeditionary Corps. During the French and German campaigns of 1944-45 the Army of Africa was expanded to 260,000 men (including 50% Indigenes and 50% white French settlers in North Africa, Pied-Noir), including the 1st Motorized Infantry Division (Zouaves and Foreign Legion), the 1st Armoured Division(Chasseurs d' Afrique and Foreign Legion), the 2nd and 4th Moroccan Infantry Divisions (Moroccan Tirailleurs), and the 3rd Algerian Infantry Division (Algerian and Tunisian Tirailleurs).  In addition three groupements de tabors  of Goumiers served as independent units while artillery, engineer, commando, reconnaissance (mechanised Spahis and tank destroyer units were drawn from the French and indigenous populations of French North Africa.

Indo-China and Algerian Wars
The Oran, Algiers and Constantine Divisions existed as divisions until at least 1955-57;  General de division Raymond Delange (:fr:Raymond Delange) commanded the Algiers Division in 1955-57, also being assistant commander of the 10th Military Region. During the Algerian War they were upgraded to corps status.

The Armée d’Afrique continued to provide a substantial portion of the French Army between 1945 and 1962. The Foreign Legion and volunteers from the Moroccan, Algerian and Tunisian tirailleur regiments served in the Indochina War between 1946 and 1954, along with nine tabors of the Moroccan Goumiers. Four regiments of Moroccan and Algerian spahis fought as infantry or halftrack armoured units.

With Moroccan and Tunisian independence in 1956, the Muslim personnel of the tirailleur and spahi units recruited in both countries were incorporated into their new national armies. This reduced the Army of Africa to the all professional Foreign Legion; the colon (French settler) conscripts and reservists of the zouaves and chasseurs d'Afrique; and the career regulars and conscripts of the remaining Muslim units. In contrast to the war in Indo-China, the Algerian War of 1954-62 was fought largely by conscripts and reservists from France itself.

Post-Algerian War
With the exception of a reduced Foreign Legion and one regiment of Spahis, all regiments of the Armée d’Afrique were disbanded or lost their former identity between 1960 and 1965. A small unit of the Infanterie Légère d'Afrique was maintained in French Somaliland until that Territory became independent in 1977. However, one regiment each of Chasseurs d'Afrique, Tirailleurs and artillery (68e Régiment d'Artillerie d'Afrique) have been re-established to maintain the traditions of their respective branches. In addition some units of engineers (31e régiment du génie), signals (41e régiment de transmissions) and transport (511e régiment du train) have been accorded ties of tradition with the old Armée d’Afrique. These appear however to be arbitrary linkages which do not reflect any real regimental continuity.

Uniforms

The uniforms of the various branches making up the Army of Africa ranged from the spectacular "tenue orientale" of the spahis, tirailleurs and zouaves to the ordinary French military dress of the chasseurs d'Afrique, Foreign Legion, Artillerie d'Afrique and Infanterie Légère d'Afrique. Even the latter units were however distinguished by details such as sashes, white kepi covers and (for the chasseurs) fezzes which made them stand out from the remainder of the French Army. Some of these features have survived as parade dress to the present day; notably the white cloaks and red sashes worn by the 1st Spahis, and the white kepis, fringed epaulettes and blue sashes of the Foreign Legion. The "fanfare-nouba" (regimental band) of the 1st Regiment of Tirailleurs still wears the full traditional "tenue orientale"; comprising white turbans, light blue zouave style jackets braided in yellow, red sashes and wide light blue or white Moorish trousers. The adoption of khaki uniforms, unlike the rest of the army who wore horizon blue was decided upon early during the First World War.

Units

European units 
Zouaves
Chasseurs d'Afrique
Légion étrangère
Infanterie Légère d'Afrique

Indigenous units 
Tirailleurs
Spahis
Goumiers
Meharistes

See also
French colonial flags
French Colonial Empire
List of French possessions and colonies

References

Sources
 
 
 
 
 
 
 
 Les Africains, Historama, hors-série 10, 1970

Armée d'Afrique
Army units and formations of France
Army units and formations of France in World War II
Military units and formations disestablished in the 1960s